"Clouds" (stylized in all caps) is a song by American rapper NF, released on February 18, 2021 along with a music video. It is the second single from his mixtape of the same name, and was written and produced by NF and Tommee Profitt. The song peaked at number 53 on the Billboard Hot 100, being NF's third-highest peaking song on the chart.

Background
NF teased the song on social media on February 17, 2021. He released it the next day and announced that it will be the title track of his then-upcoming mixtape.

Composition
The song finds NF pondering how he will release music in the future, over a violin instrumental, rapping: "Mixtapes aren't my thing but it's been awfully exhausting / Hanging onto songs this long is daunting".

Charts

Certifications

References

2021 singles
2021 songs
NF (rapper) songs
Songs written by NF (rapper)
Songs written by Tommee Profitt